Yeshivat Torat Shraga (or Yeshivas Toras Shraga) is a post-high school yeshiva in Bayit Vegan, Jerusalem. Rabbi Avishai David is the rosh yeshiva. It is located on the Yeshiva University Israel campus and conducts its Torah study in the Beis Medrash with the Yeshiva University Gruss Kollel.

History and staff

The Yeshiva originally opened on August 29, 2001 with a core group of 14 students. By the end of that year, there were only 11 students left. The original Rosh Yeshiva was Rabbi Chaim Brovender, and the yeshiva was operated under the umbrella of Ohr Torah Stone Institutions. The original teaching staff included Rabbi Dovid Ebner, Rabbi Gershon Clymer, Rabbi Yisroel Cohn, among others.

Later, Rabbi Avishai David became the rosh yeshiva.  The menahel is Rabbi Michael Olshin.  Rabbi Dr. Gil Elmaleh is the Dean of Students. By 2006 the Yeshiva had 70 first-year students, 24 second-year students and 6 counselors.

Daily schedule

The lecturers in Torat Shraga include:

Morning Seder: Rosh Yeshiva Rabbi Avishai David, Rabbi Moshe Nechemiah Reichman (son of Rabbi Hershel Reichman), Rabbi Avraham Lubarsky, Rabbi Moshe Willig (son of Rabbi Mordechai Willig), Rav David Shamula, Rabbi Avi Schneider, Rabbi Judah Goldshmidt, Rabbi Dr. Howard Apfel, Rabbi Andi Yudin.

Afternoon Seder: Rabbi Yehudah Werblowsky (son-in-law of Rabbi Hanoch Teller), Rabbi Hillel Zinkin, Rabbi Binyomin Staiman, Rabbi Michael Olshin, Rabbi Avraham Willig (son of Rabbi Mordechai Willig), Rabbi Yossi Fuchs

Night Seder: Rabbi Menachem Jackobowitz, Rabbi Wittenstein, Rabbi Avi Tillman, Rabbi Yehudah Werblowsky, Binny Feinmesser, Rabbi Avraham Willig, Rabbi Moshe Willig, Rabbi Judah Goldshmidt, Rabbi Hillel Zinkin, Rav David Shamula, Rabbi Eric Ifrah, and Rabbi Benni Eisner.

Campus 

The Yeshiva is located at 40 Duv Devani, Bayit Vegan, Jerusalem in Yeshiva University's Gruss Kollel Campus.  The students of Yeshivat Torat Shraga and the Gruss Kollel students are integrated with each other. In addition to sharing a Beit Midrash, most members of the Gruss Kollel study with Torat Shraga students.  In addition to these study sessions, there are weekly home sessions where the Torat Shraga students go to the home of a Gruss Kollel member for informal study.

Torat Shraga goes on many trips throughout the year including trips to the Golan, Tsfat, and the Negev. The Yeshiva also has several Chesed activities and trips to visit Gedolim. On both Yom Ha'atzmaut and Yom Yerushalayim the Yeshiva travels to various places.

External links
Yeshivat Torat Shraga

Notes

Orthodox yeshivas in Jerusalem
Yeshiva University